Ronald Crichton (28 December 1913 – 16 November 2005) was a music critic for the Financial Times in the 1960s and 1970s. He was a scion of the Earls of Erne. In his Times obituary he was described as "one of the last of the school of those cultured mandarins who were able to write and talk about all matters concerning the arts."

Education and early career
He was born in Scarborough, North Yorkshire, the son of Colonel Charles William Harry Crichton, DSO (1872-1958), by his wife Dorothy Maud (who died in 1959), daughter of the Hon. Eustace Henry Dawnay, scion of the Viscounts Downe. He was educated at Radley College and Christ Church, Oxford, where he read French, but also discovered opera through the University Opera Club, then in its earliest days. He persuaded the club to mount the first British performance of Castor et Pollux by Rameau in November 1934 at Magdalen College. 

After Oxford Crichton became secretary of the Anglo-French Art and Travel Society, through which he was able to organise the visits of French theatrical companies to the UK, most notably Comédie-Française's appearance at the Savoy Theatre in 1938.

Ballet
Crichton worked with the choreographer Andrée Howard on her best known ballet  (1940), premiered by the London Ballet at the Arts Theatre, London. Although based on an episode in Alain-Fournier's novel , Crichton produced a significantly adapted libretto, and also chose the six piano pieces and songs by Fauré used in the score (which were orchestrated by Guy Warrack). It was taken up by the Royal Ballet in 1958 and has subsequently received hundreds of performances.

Critic
After serving in the Army in Britain and Greece during the war, Crichton joined the British Council, where he worked over the next two decades in Greece, Belgium, West Germany and London. His freelance writing began in the early 1960s, and in 1967 he joined The Financial Times as a full-time critic, taking over from Andrew Porter as chief music critic in 1972. He retired from the FT in 1978. He also wrote for Opera magazine and The Dancing Times, edited books on the works of Manuel de Falla and Ethel Smyth, wrote the BBC Music Guide on de Falla (1992), and was a contributor to The New Grove Dictionary of Music (1979) and The New Grove Dictionary of Opera (1992). 

Crichton shared the latter years of his life with his partner Juan Soriano, in Eastbourne and later in Barcelona, where Soriano came from. He died at the age of 91 in 2005 in Arenys de Mar, a town some 25 miles to the north of Barcelona City. At the time he was working on a history of French opera.

References

External links

British music critics
Classical music critics
Opera critics
1913 births
2005 deaths
People from Scarborough, North Yorkshire